Acacia olsenii is a species of Acacia native to eastern Australia.

References

olsenii
Fabales of Australia
Flora of New South Wales